The filmography of Slovak actress Emília Vášáryová consists of forty-two motion pictures, for which she received nine awards as Best Actress in a Leading Role, plus a nomination for a Supporting Role. These include two ZČDU Awards for Who Leaves in the Rain... (1974) and the Lawyer (1977), a ÚV SZŽ Gold Plaque (also for the Lawyer), a Czech Lion award for Up and Down (2004), as well as a Czech Lion nomination for Nasty (2008), a Cinema Award, a SFZ Reward, a ÚSTT Reward, and a Literature Fund Reward (each for Up and Down), and a Golden Goblet award for Václav (2008). Simultaneously, she made one-hundred-thirty-four television films and/or series, earning additional awards (such as a Golden Croc, three Telemuse awards, a Golden Loop, IGRIC, OTO, and/or ELSA). For her work in theater she achieved a Janko Borodáč Award, an Andrej Bagar Award, an Alfréd Radok Award, a Crystal Wing, three Dosky Awards, a Jozef Kroner Award, a Literature Fund award, a Tatra Banka Reward, an award at the To Najlepšie z Humoru Festival, and/or a Komerční banka Award.

Filmography

Cinema

Notes
A  In Hungary the film was released under title Szent Péter esernyöje.
B  Released abroad as Voyage to the End of the Universe.
C  Released abroad as That Cat, When the Cat Comes, and The Cat Who Wore Sunglasses.
D  Also released as a two episode TV-series.
E  In the Czech region the film was titled Tři zlaté vlasy děda Vševěda.
F  A short movie.

Television

Notes
F  A TV series.
G  In Hungary the film was titled Vivát, Benyovszky!
H  The work was screened in cinema as a movie.
I  A short film.
J  In Germany the movie was entitled Die Pfauenfeder.
K  In Germany the film was released as Dido – Das Geheimnis des Fisches.
L  In Hungary the work was entitled Amine emlékezete.
M  A soap opera.

See also
 Emília Vášáryová awards and nominations
 List of Academy Award winners and nominees for Best Foreign Language Film
 List of Czech submissions for the Academy Award for Best Foreign Language Film
 Golden Goblet Award for Best Actress
 List of winners of Alfréd Radok Awards

References

General

 
 
Specific

External links 
 
 
 Emília Vášáryová's gallery by MF DNES
 Emília Vášáryová's photos by Kinobox

Actress filmographies